Dilsea is a red algae genus in the Dumontiaceae family.

Habitat 
Dilsea carnosa has been located along the coasts of several countries within the United Kingdom in high frequencies.

References

External links 
 http://www.algaebase.org/search/genus/detail/?genus_id=111 Algaebase

Red algae genera
Dumontiaceae
Taxa named by John Stackhouse